The Shook-Vanzant Farm, also known as the Moore Farm, is a historic farmhouse near Winchester, Tennessee, U.S.. It was built in 1893 for Nathan Shook. The property includes several other buildings, including two houses, several barns, and a garage. It was later acquired by the Vanzant family, whose descendants are the Moore family.

The house was designed in the Queen Anne architectural style. It has been listed on the National Register of Historic Places since July 31, 1998.

References

National Register of Historic Places in Franklin County, Tennessee
Queen Anne architecture in Tennessee
Houses completed in 1893
Farms on the National Register of Historic Places in Tennessee